Wang Yun may refer to:

 Wang Yun (Han dynasty) (137–192), bureaucrat during the late Han dynasty
 Wang Yun (Yuan dynasty) (1228–1304), poet of the Yuan dynasty
 Wang Yun (Qing dynasty) (1749–1819), poet of the Qing dynasty
 Wang Yun (footballer) (born 1983), Chinese footballer